"Windswept" is a single performed by Bryan Ferry, the lead vocalist for Roxy Music. The track is the third and final single from the chart-topping album Boys and Girls which was released in 1985, but unlike the previous singles it did not reach the top 40 in the UK singles chart.

The track features Mark Knopfler, the guitarist of Dire Straits. An instrumental version of the track appears as the B-side on the single "Is Your Love Strong Enough?" from the Ridley Scott film Legend (1985).

The UK version of the single has four tracks, with the 3 B-sides all being outtakes from the album The Bride Stripped Bare (1978); an original track ("Broken Wings") and covers of "Crazy Love" (by Van Morrison) and "Feel the Need" (by Detroit Emeralds).

The French model Laurence Treil appears in the music video and it was directed by Derek Jarman.

Chart performance
Singles

References

External links

1985 singles
Bryan Ferry songs
Songs written by Bryan Ferry
1985 songs